Javier "Javi" Ros Añón (born 16 February 1990) is a Spanish professional footballer who plays as a midfielder for CF Rayo Majadahonda.

Club career
Born in Pamplona, Navarre, Ros played his youth football with Real Sociedad. Being signed at the age of only 12, he travelled regularly by taxi from Tudela to the club's training facilities, until eventually moving to a school in San Sebastián. He made his senior debut in the 2008–09 season, appearing for the reserves in Segunda División B and suffering relegation.

Ros made his first appearance for the first team on 23 May 2009, coming on as a substitute for another youth graduate, Markel Bergara, in the early stages of a 1–0 away win against UD Salamanca. As the Basques had no chance to promote from Segunda División from that moment onwards, he started in the last four games of the campaign, renewing his contract until 2014 at its closure.

In late January 2010, Ros was loaned to neighbouring SD Eibar in the third tier. Subsequently, he returned to Real Sociedad, going on to be a very important midfield unit for the B's over two full seasons, still in division three.

On 19 August 2012, Ros made his first appearance in La Liga, playing 12 minutes in a 5–1 loss at FC Barcelona. He finished his first season with the main squad with just seven competitive appearances, totalling 161 minutes of action.

Ros scored his first goal for Real Sociedad on 18 December 2013, opening the scoring in a 4–0 home rout of Algeciras CF in the round of 32 of the Copa del Rey (5–1 on aggregate). His second came on 16 January of the following year for the same competition, the only in the tie against Villarreal CF to qualify his team to the quarter-finals.

On 19 July 2014, Ros joined second-division club RCD Mallorca on a free transfer, signing a two-year contract. In January 2016, again as a free agent, he moved to Real Zaragoza of the same league.

A regular starter in his first seasons, Ros lost his starting spot midway through 2019–20, and suffered a knee injury which kept him out for six months in December 2020. On 30 January 2022, he was loaned to SD Amorebieta also of the second tier for six months.

Personal life
Ros was the fifth of seven brothers and sisters, Mikel being his twin. His older sibling Iñigo was also a footballer and a midfielder, spending the vast majority of his professional career in the third division and also representing Real Sociedad B and Eibar.

References

External links

1990 births
Living people
Spanish twins
Spanish footballers
Footballers from Pamplona
Association football midfielders
La Liga players
Segunda División players
Segunda División B players
Tercera División players
Primera Federación players
Real Sociedad B footballers
Real Sociedad footballers
SD Eibar footballers
RCD Mallorca players
Real Zaragoza players
SD Amorebieta footballers
CD Badajoz players
CF Rayo Majadahonda players